Heloísa Helena may refer to:

Heloísa Helena (actress) (1917–1999), Brazilian actress
Heloísa Helena (politician) (born 1962), Brazilian politician